Langballig is a municipality in the district of Schleswig-Flensburg, in Schleswig-Holstein, Germany. It is situated near the Baltic Sea, approx. 13 km east of Flensburg.

Langballig is the seat of the Amt ("collective municipality") Langballig.

References

Schleswig-Flensburg